Fadhil Jamil Barwari (1966 – 20 September 2018) was an Iraqi general who served as the commander of the Special Forces of Iraq. Graduated from the Second Military College in Zakho, Barwari is known for his key role in retaking cities back that were previously controlled by Islamic state during the War in Iraq 2013-2017.

History

Barwari was born in Duhok in 1966 to Kurdish family from Zahko. Prior to joining the Peshmerga, a Kurdish resistance movement that opposed the Ba'athist government, he graduated from the Second Military College in Zahko.

Barwari started out as a 2nd Lieutenant in the 1990s under the Peshmerga, in the new Iraqi Army he Became a 1st Lieutenant in 2004, Captain in 2005, Major in 2005, Lieutenant Colonel in 2006, Colonel in 2007, Brigadier General in 2007 and finally Major General in 2008. Assuming the Office of Commander in 2007.

He was Also the 36th Commando Battalions Commander from 2003-2007 until it was incorporated into the CTS (Counter Terrorism Service).

Barwari rejoined the Iraqi Army in 2004 after the U.S. invasion. He quickly rose through the ranks of the military ladder, becoming the commanding officer of the Iraqi Special Operations Forces (ISOF), an elite special forces detachment trained by the United States Army's Special Forces and equipped with American weaponry. In this capacity, he directed Iraqi special forces in the 2014 Anbar campaign.

In November 2017, two former DynCorp workers testified in an Alexandria, Virginia federal court that Barwari paid them hundreds of thousands of dollars to arrange an overpriced lease of land the general owned near the Baghdad airport, starting in 2011.

Barwari died on 20 September 2018 from a heart attack.

See also
Iraq War
War on Terror
War in Iraq (2013-2017)

References

Iraqi generals
Year of birth uncertain
1966 births
2018 deaths
People of the War in Iraq (2013–2017)
Iraqi Kurdish people
People from Duhok